Calvert & Co was an English porter brewery in the eighteenth century. Calvert brewed at the City of London brewery. Between 1784 and 1791 it was the second largest brewery in the world in terms of production volume.

History
The Hour Glass Brewery was founded at 89 Thames Street by 1431. The Calvert family acquired it in 1730. In 1805 a fire destroyed the premises. In 1860 the City of London Brewing Company was formed to acquire Calverts.

References

Breweries in London
Food and drink companies established in 1730
1730 establishments in England
British companies established in 1730